Werner Pluskat (1912  11 June 2002) was a major, commanding the 1st Battalion of the 352nd Artillery Regiment of the German 352nd Infantry Division during the Allied invasion in Normandy.

He was credited in the movie The Longest Day, a film about the D-Day invasion, with being the first German officer who saw the Allied invasion fleet on 6 June 1944, heading toward their landing zone at Omaha Beach. Oberleutnant (M.A.) Walter Ohmsen, commander of the Crisbecq Battery, was also credited with being the first to discover the Allied invasion fleet through the battery rangefinder. However, Heinrich "Hein" Severloh, a German machine gunner on Omaha Beach that day, wrote in his book WN62: A German Soldier's Memories of the Defence of Omaha Beach, Normandy, June 6, 1944 that Pluskat was not with his unit the day of the invasion and "was not truthfully portrayed" in the film. Pluskat's men fired their guns on Omaha Beach until they ran out of ammunition.

Pluskat was with Generalleutnant Kurt Dittmar when they surrendered to soldiers of the U.S. 30th Infantry Division at Magdeburg on 23 April 1945.

For the production of The Longest Day, Pluskat was one of many Axis and Allied military consultants to have actually been on the beach on June 6. In the film, he was portrayed by Hans Christian Blech.

References

Bibliography

 Tanne, Philippe. Batterie de Crisbecq — The Crisbecq Battery (in French and English). Album Memorial by Editions Aubert'Graphic.

External links
The Batterie at Longues sur Mer
Widerstandsnest WN 59
[Hein Severloh, WN62: A German Soldier's Memories of the Defence of Omaha Beach,I.M.K. Creativ Verlag, Garbsen, Germany, 2000]

German Army officers of World War II
2002 deaths
1912 births